Consulting Engineering Center (CEC) is an international infrastructure engineering consultancy firm established in Amman, Jordan in 1974. CEC provides service in the study, design, construction supervision and management of water, waste water, environment, dams and transportation projects including airports and ports. CEC currently has five international registered branches in Saudi Arabia, Lesotho, Palestine, Albania and Uganda. Throughout its history CEC has operated in more than 30 countries around the world and currently has more than 200 permanent staff operating internationally.

CEC's Scope of Work covers all fields related to water, wastewater collection and treatment, effluent re-use, dams, environmental impact assessments and transportation projects. Such scope encompasses technical assistance, feasibility studies, engineering designs, construction supervision and management, quality control, cost recovery systems setup, as well as, institutional strengthening and training.

Operations and services 

CEC's operations currently span 3 continents; boasting a work force of more than 200 engineers and technicians from 5 strategically located offices in The Kingdom of Saudi Arabia, Palestine, Albania, Lesotho and Uganda. CEC's scope of work Covers all fields related to water, wastewater collection and treatment, effluent re-use, dams, environmental impact assessments and all types transportation projects including highways, seaports and airports. Such scope of services encompass; Preliminary investigations, master planning, feasibility studies, detailed design, preparation of contract and tender documents, Project management and construction supervision, quality control, cost recovery systems setup, as well as, institutional strengthening and training.

•	Transportation: Transportation studies and all structures for urban and long distance expressways; regional highways; local roads, rural and special purpose roads.

•	Airports: General location studies and infrastructure, access facilities, taxiways, terminal buildings and utilities.

•	Ports and Harbors: Feasibility studies to commissioning of all marine works and structures, terminal buildings and road access utilities.

•	Water and Waste-water: River basin planning, hydroelectric power, dams, weirs and canals. Piping and distribution of drinking and industrial water; collection and treatment of sewerage and waste water.

Awards and recognition  

CEC was the first consulting engineering firm in the Middle East to acquire the ISO 9001 and is among the first few to upgrade its certification to ISO 9001: 2000 and ISO 9001:2008

CEC is the first Consulting Engineering Firm in the MENA Region to Acquire the Recognized for Excellence Certificate (R4E) (3 Star-2012) from the European Foundation for Quality Management (EFQM).

CEC has been awarded by the Federation of Consultants from Islamic Countries (FCIC) with the Seal of Excellence for four years since 2008, and recently for the years 2015/2016

CEC was awarded the King Abdullah II Award for Excellence for the years 2003- 2004, 2005–2006, 2008-2009 and 2012–2013.

References

External links
CEC website

Engineering companies of Jordan